Coalition for Open Education (Koalicja Otwartej Edukacji, KOED) - is a coalition of institutions supporting and developing Open Educational Resources (OER) in Poland.

The conference "Open Educational Resources in Poland", organized by KOED in the Polish Parliament on 23 April 2009 was the first major OER event of this kind. From 2009 Coalition is an organizer of Public Domain Day in Poland, event widely covered in mainstream media.

See also
 Open access in Poland

References

External links
 Official Open Education Coalition website

Polish educational societies
2008 establishments in Poland
Organizations established in 2008